Morgan Duane Fox (born September 12, 1994) is an American football defensive end for the Los Angeles Chargers of the National Football League (NFL).  He played college football at CSU-Pueblo. He signed with the Los Angeles Rams as an undrafted free agent in 2016.

Early years
Fox attended and played for Fountain-Fort Carson High School in Fountain, Colorado. Fox grew up in a military family as his father served in the Army.

College career
Fox played college football for Colorado State University Pueblo where he, as a senior, was named a finalist for the Cliff Harris Small College Defensive Player of the Year. As a senior he was also a finalist for the Gene Upshaw Award. He finished first in the nation in sacks per game with 1.42, while the 128 sack yards was first nationally. In 12 games, he totaled 17.0 sacks to rank second in Division II and his 15 solo sacks was second. He finished his senior season with 52 tackles (32 solo), forced and recovered a fumble and added one pass break-up.

Professional career

Los Angeles Rams
After going undrafted in the 2016 NFL Draft, Fox signed with the Los Angeles Rams on May 4, 2016, as an undrafted free agent. On September 3, 2016, he was waived by the Rams as part of final roster cuts. The next day, he was signed to the Rams' practice squad. He was promoted to the active roster on October 8, 2016. He was released on October 11, 2016, and was re-signed to the practice squad. He was promoted again by the Rams on December 15, 2016.

On September 10, 2017, in the season opener against the Indianapolis Colts, Fox recorded a safety for the Rams when he took down Colts quarterback Jacoby Brissett in the end zone.

On May 24, 2018, Fox tore his anterior cruciate ligament during organized team activities, effectively ending his 2018 season. He was placed on injured reserve on August 31, 2018. Without Fox, the Rams reached Super Bowl LIII where they lost 13–3 to the New England Patriots.

On May 15, 2020, Fox re-signed with the Rams.

Carolina Panthers
On March 18, 2021, Fox signed a two-year contract with the Carolina Panthers. He played in 17 games with nine starts, recording a career-high 34 tackles, 1.5 sacks, a forced fumble and a fumble recovery.

On March 14, 2022, Fox was released by the Panthers.

Los Angeles Chargers
On May 18, 2022, Fox signed with the Los Angeles Chargers. He played in 17 games with 12 starts, recording a career-high 38 tackles and 6.5 sacks.

Fox re-signed with the Chargers on March 16, 2023.

Personal life 
Fox owns a French bulldog, Winston, that was named Reserve Best in Show (second place) at the 2022 Westminster Kennel Club Dog Show. Winston won the non-sporting group, beating out 321 other dogs. Winston claimed victory in the Non-Sporting Group in a field of 20 breeds at the 2022 National Dog Show in Philadelphia. He later won Best in Show, beating out around 1,500 dogs representing 212 breeds recognized by the American Kennel Club and then six group winners before taking home the top prize.

References

External links
 CSU Pueblo bio
 Los Angeles Chargers bio
 Morgan Fox on Instagram

1994 births
Living people
People from Fountain, Colorado
Players of American football from Colorado
American football defensive ends
CSU Pueblo ThunderWolves football players
Los Angeles Rams players
Carolina Panthers players
Los Angeles Chargers players